Băcioi is a commune in Chişinău municipality, Moldova. It is composed of four villages: Băcioi, Brăila, Frumușica, and Străisteni.

References

Communes of Chișinău Municipality